Volha Hayeva (born 2 November 1982) is a road cyclist from Belarus. In 2004, she became national champion in the road race and represented her nation at the 2004 Summer Olympics. She also rode at the 2004 and 2005 UCI Road World Championships.

References

External links
 profile at Procyclingstats.com

1982 births
Belarusian female cyclists
Living people
Place of birth missing (living people)
Cyclists at the 2004 Summer Olympics
Olympic cyclists of Belarus